Public Law is an academic law journal published four times a year by Sweet & Maxwell. The journal was established in 1956 by Professor John Griffith (London School of Economics). Subsequent editors have been: Professor Graham Zellick (Queen Mary, University of London), Professor Anthony Bradley (University of Edinburgh), Professor Dawn Oliver (UCL), Professor Andrew Le Sueur (Queen Mary, University of London), Professor Maurice Sunkin (University of Essex), and since 2021 co-editors Professors Roger Masterman and Aileen McHarg (Durham University). Its main focus is on British constitutional and administrative law but it also publishes articles relating to other European and Commonwealth jurisdictions and the USA.

British law journals